BNQ or bnq may refer to:

 BNQ, the Indian Railways station code for Banarhat railway station, West Bengal, India
 bnq, the ISO 639-3 code for Bantik language, Indonesia
 Bibliothèque nationale du Québec (BNQ), forerunner of the Bibliothèque et Archives nationales du Québec